Jacqueline Sly (born May 17, 1948) is an American politician and a Republican member of the South Dakota House of Representatives representing District 33 since January 2009.

Education
Sly earned her Bachelor of Arts degrees in elementary and special education from Northern State University and her Master of Arts degrees in curriculum and instruction from Black Hills State University.

Elections
2012 When incumbent Republican Representative Phil Jensen ran for South Dakota Senate and left a District 33 seat open, Sly and Scott Craig were unopposed for the June 5, 2012 Republican Primary; in the three-way November 6, 2012 General election, Sly took the first seat with 6,308 votes (43.2%) and Craig took the second seat ahead of Democratic nominee Robin Page.
2008 When District 33 incumbent Republican Representatives Michael Buckingham ran for South Dakota Senate and Don Van Etten was term limited and left the Legislature leaving both District 33 seats open, Sly ran in the four-way June 3, 2008 Republican Primary and placed first with 850 votes (28.8%); in the four-way November 4, 2008 General election Sly took the first seat with 5,043 votes (32.1%) and fellow Republican nominee Phil Jensen took the second seat ahead of Democratic nominees Jeff Nelson and Kimberly Henderson.
2010 Sly and incumbent Representative Jensen were unopposed for both the June 8, 2010 Republican Primary and the November 2, 2010 General election, where Representative Jensen took the first seat and Sly took the second seat with 3,769 votes (43.38%).

References

External links
Official page at the South Dakota Legislature
 

Place of birth missing (living people)
1948 births
Living people
Black Hills State University alumni
Republican Party members of the South Dakota House of Representatives
Northern State University alumni
Politicians from Rapid City, South Dakota
Women state legislators in South Dakota
21st-century American politicians
21st-century American women politicians